The Grand Rapids Terminal Railroad was a terminal railroad in Grand Rapids, Michigan.  Established about 1906, it was absorbed by the Grand Trunk Western Railroad in 1928.

Grand Trunk Railway subsidiaries
Defunct Michigan railroads
Predecessors of the Grand Trunk Railway